Richard Wayne "Rick" West is a politician currently serving as the mayor of Chesapeake, Virginia. Prior to assuming the office of mayor in November 2017, he served as a member of the city council for ten years. West also served as a public school administrator for over 20 years.

Early life
Rick West was born and raised in rural Chesapeake. Since his father was in the U.S. Navy and deployed often, his mother and grandfather had the primary responsibility of raising Rick, his two brothers and two sisters.

Electoral history

References

Year of birth missing (living people)
Living people
Mayors of Chesapeake, Virginia
Virginia Republicans